The XII 2017 Oceania Badminton Championships was the 12th tournament of the Oceania Badminton Championships. It was held in Nouméa, New Caledonia from 13 to 15 February 2017.

Venue
Salle Anewy in Nouméa, New Caledonia.

Medalists

Individual event
The table below gives an overview of the individual event medal winners at the 2017 Oceania Championships.

References

External links
 Individual Results

Oceania Badminton Championships
Oceania Badminton Championships
International sports competitions hosted by New Caledonia
Badminton in New Caledonia